Jonathan James English (26 March 1949 – 9 March 2016) was an English-born Australian singer, songwriter, musician and actor. He emigrated from England to Australia with his parents in 1961. He was an early vocalist and rhythm guitarist for Sebastian Hardie but left to take on the role of Judas Iscariot in the Australian version of the stage musical Jesus Christ Superstar from May 1972, which was broadcast on television. English was also a noted solo singer; his Australian top twenty hit singles include "Turn the Page", "Hollywood Seven", "Words are Not Enough", "Six Ribbons" and "Hot Town".

English was acclaimed for his starring role in the 1978 Australian TV series Against the Wind – he won the TV Week Logie Award for 'Best New Talent in Australia'. He also co-wrote and performed the score with Mario Millo (ex-Sebastian Hardie). The series had international release, known as Mot alla vindar (1980) in Swedish, where "Six Ribbons" was released as a single, both single and the soundtrack album peaked at No.1 on the Norwegian charts; the first single, "Six Ribbons" and the album, peaked at No.4 on the Swedish charts.

From 1983 to 1985, English won four Mo Awards with three consecutive 'Entertainer of the Year' awards and a further 'Male Vocal Performer' in 1985. English has performed in Gilbert and Sullivan's operettas The Pirates of Penzance, The Mikado and H.M.S. Pinafore from 1984. Performances of Essgee Entertainment's productions of the Gilbert and Sullivan trilogy from 1994 to 1997 were broadcast on Australian TV. They were all released on VHS and subsequently on DVD.

Biography

1949–65: early years
Jonathan James English was born in 1949 in Hampstead, London, to Sydney and Sheila English, with siblings Janet, Jeremy and Jill. Sheila had worked as a hospital worker, teacher and ambulance driver; Sydney was working in air cargo for KLM and was moved to Sydney Airport. Sheila and the children followed, when the family emigrated to Australia in 1961 on RMS Orion with English turning 12 years old just before calling-in at Fremantle. Sydney had bought a house in Cabramatta, where young Jon attended Cabramatta High School. Sydney was a self-taught piano player and dabbled with guitar and drums, he bought a guitar for the young Jon English. Janet took her younger brother to the Sydney Stadium to see the Beatles perform during their 1964 Australian tour.

1965–72: first bands and Rugby player

English's first rock gig occurred when his neighbour's band needed a guitarist, he was about 16 and mid-performance was called upon to do vocals, he sang the Beatles' "Twist and Shout". His earliest known band was Zenith in 1965, formed at Cabramatta High School, and according to English "they were crap". Next was Gene Chandler & the Interns, which included guitarist Graham Ford, drummer Richard Lillico, bass guitarist Peter Plavsic and English as vocalist and rhythm guitarist. At the same time, he played Lock for the Parramatta Eels reserve grade team. Ford founded Sebastian Hardie Blues Band in 1967 with Lillico and new band members. They played R&B and soul covers but disbanded by early 1968. When Ford reformed the band later in 1968, he recruited English and Peter Plavsic again, Anatole Kononewsky on keyboards and Peter's brother Alex Plavsic on drums. They had dropped the 'Blues Band' part to play more pop oriented music and were the backing band for legendary Australian rocker Johnny O'Keefe during 1969. Covering songs from the Rolling Stones, the Beatles, Bob Dylan, Otis Redding and Wilson Pickett they built a reputation in the Sydney pub scene. Also attending Cabramatta High School, but one year lower was Carmen Sora; Sora and English married in September 1969 when she was 19 and he was 20. In January 1972, English left Sebastian Hardie when he won the role of Judas Iscariot in the Australian version of Jesus Christ Superstar from May 1972. Sebastian Hardie were later joined by Mario Millo on vocals and lead guitar and Toivo Pilt on keyboards. By 1974 they had become Australia's first symphonic rock band and released Four Moments in August 1975, which was produced by English.

1972–1979: Actor and solo performer

Australian theatre producer Harry M. Miller and theatre director Jim Sharman had worked on the stage musical Hair and kept some of the cast and crew for their next project, the Australian version of Jesus Christ Superstar by Tim Rice/Andrew Lloyd Webber. Miller and Sharman chose English, from over 2,000 applicants, to take the starring role of Judas Iscariot alongside fellow stars Trevor White (ex-Sounds Unlimited) as Jesus Christ and Michele Fawdon as Mary Magdalene. The initial run was from 4 May 1972, at Sydney's Capitol Theatre, to February 1974 with over 700 shows, it included other Australian music/theatre performers Reg Livermore (from Hair, later in The Rocky Horror Show), John Paul Young (later a solo singer with "Love is in the Air"), Marcia Hines (from Hair, took over as Mary Magdalene in 1973, later a solo singer with "You"), Doug Parkinson (Doug Parkinson in Focus had a hit with "Dear Prudence", took over from Livermore) and Stevie Wright (ex-the Easybeats, later a solo singer with "Evie").

Jesus Christ Superstar – Original Australian Cast Recording was released by MCA in 1972 with English and other cast members performing vocals for a studio recording. A documentary of the production was broadcast on national TV, it contained footage of performances and interviews with cast members. English reprised his role of Judas in the 1975 and 1978 productions. During 1974, English co-wrote, with Roy Ritchie, the ballet Phases which was performed by the New South Wales Dance Company at the Sydney Opera House. While performing in Superstar, English also performed as a rock vocalist both with bands, Tapestry, Pulsar and Duck, and solo. He sang on the studio cast recording of Reg Livermore and Patrick Flynn's rock opera, Ned Kelly, and used some of the Superstar chorus band to help record his debut solo album, Wine Dark Sea released on Warm & Genuine Records/Phonogram Records in March 1973. His debut single "Handbags and Gladrags", released at the same time, was a cover of the Mike d'Abo song, which had been a Top 40 hit in the UK for singer Chris Farlowe in 1967. English's version peaked at No.50 on the Australian singles charts. His second single from the album was the Webber / Rice song "Close Every Door" from their Joseph and the Amazing Technicolor Dreamcoat stage musical.

It's All a Game, his second solo album, was released in 1974 on Warm & Genuine and featured "Turn the Page" which peaked at No.20 on the national singles charts in February 1975. "Lovin' Arms" was released in June 1975 as the lead single from his third studio album, Hollywood Seven The album produced three singles including "Hollywood Seven" which peaked at No.13 in May 1976. English performed a duet with fellow Superstar lead, Trevor White to release a single "Laid Back in Anger" but it had no singles chart success. His next album, Minutes to Midnight was released in 1977. English created the Jon English Band for touring with Steve Doran (keyboards), Danny Groves (drums), Eric Macitchka (guitar), Rick Mellick (keyboards), James Rattray (bass) and Mike Wade (guitar). His fifth studio album Words are not Enough from 1978 contained the title track which peaked at No.6 and "Night in Paradise" which peaked at No.44. English also performed in the stage musical The Bacchoi in 1974 for Nimrod Theatre Company; and in minor TV roles in police dramas Matlock Police in 1975, Homicide in 1976 and Chopper Squad in 1978. A recurring role in Number 96 was as a cultish drug lord, "The Master", in 1976. English described these roles "I was doing a lot of police shows in those days. I got to do them all. I was always a drug-crazed axe murdering hippy."

In 1978, TV's Seven Network and Pegasus Productions approached English to take the role of Jonathan Garrett in the historical romance miniseries Against the Wind. Prior to production he asked if he could organise the score and soundtrack with his friend, Mario Millo.

From the soundtrack, "Six Ribbons" was released as a single by English and Millo. It peaked at No.5 on the National singles charts and the soundtrack peaked at No.10 on the National albums charts. On 16 March 1979 English won the TV Week Logie Award for 'Best New Talent in Australia' for his acting performance in Against the Wind, the programme won two other Logie Awards. English also won the 'Most Popular Male Performer' award at the 1979 TV Week/Countdown Music Awards. He released his first compilation album English History in August, which peaked at No.4 on the national albums charts and sold over 180,000 copies. Singles success with "Get Your Love Right", which peaked at No.27 and "Hot Town", which peaked at No.11; prompted English to form Baxter Funt, containing John Coker (bass), Greg Henson (drums), Tony Naylor (guitar; ex-Bootleg Family Band/Avalanche), Mike Wade (guitar) and Peter White (keyboards). Henson and Wade had been in the Superstar chorus band from 1972 and, as part of Baxter Funt, they were taken on a national tour and then internationally.

1980s: International success
In April 1980, English released Calm Before the Storm which peaked at No.17 on the albums charts, with a single "Carmilla" peaking at No.27; this was followed by the less successful In Roads from 1981 and single "Straight from the Heart". Meanwhile, Against the Wind was shown on international TV stations in United Kingdom and other parts of Europe as Gegen den Wind in Germany and Mot alla vindar in Scandinavia. Success in Scandinavia included the soundtrack peaking at No.1 on the Norwegian Albums charts and double-A sided single, "Mot alla vendor"/"Six Ribbons" peaked at No.1 on the Norwegian Singles charts. English History, his compilation album also peaked at No.1, follow up albums Calm Before the Storm and In Roads both reached the Top Ten in Norway. In Sweden the soundtrack and the "Six Ribbons" single both peaked at No.4 on the relevant charts in 1980, later English History and "Hollywood Seven" reached the top twenty in their charts. During 1981, English toured UK and Scandinavia with Mario Millo (guitars, ex-Sebastian Hardie), (guitar), Jackie Orszaczky (bass; ex-Syrius, Bakery, Marcia Hines Band), Coz Russo (keyboards), Richard Gawned (tenor sax, flute; ex-Marcia Hines Band) and Nick Lister (drums; ex-Kush). The live double album, Beating the Boards was released in June 1982 with backing by the Foster Brothers containing John Coker (bass), John Dallimore (guitar, flute, vocals; ex-Redhouse), Peter Deacon (keyboards, vocals), Greg Henson (drums) and Keith Kerwin (guitar, vocals; ex-Southern Star Band). The single "Beating the Boards' was released in June 1982 and peaked at No.97. English teamed with former Superstar co-lead, Marcia Hines, to produce July 1982's mini-album Jokers and Queens and its self-titled single, the album peaked at No.36 on the Australian albums charts and the single reached No.62 on the singles charts. Some People... was released in 1982 and produced the top 50 single "Some People (Have All The Fun)". In August 1984, English and Renée Geyer released "Every Beat of My Heart" from the Street Hero soundtrack.

English took on the role of Pirate King for the first time in the 1984 production of Gilbert and Sullivan's comic opera The Pirates of Penzance alongside June Bronhill and fellow actor/singer Simon Gallaher as Frederic. English estimates he has performed his favorite role of Pirate King over 1,000 times. He later took on other stage musicals, including Rasputin (1987) and Big River (1988), toured with various line-ups of the Foster Brothers and released Some People... (1983) produced by David Mackay, Dark Horses (1987) and The Busker (1988), with his best charting Australian single from these being "Some People (Have all the Fun)" which peaked at No.50 in 1983. During 1983–85, English won four Mo Awards with three consecutive 'Entertainer of the Year' awards and a further 'Male Vocal Performer' in 1985.

In 1988, English collaborated on the song "You're Not Alone" which was The Australian Official Olympic Team Song. It peaked at number 23 on the ARIA Charts.

1990s: All Together Now
In 1990, English released Busking/Always the Busker but the album did not chart. In November 1990, "Love Has Power" was released as a single from his musical concept album, Paris. At the ARIA Music Awards of 1991, the album won the ARIA Award for Best Original Soundtrack, Cast or Show Album.

During 1991—93, English played the main role of Bobby Rivers in the TV sitcom All Together Now. His role of a faded one hit wonder rock star displayed his acting and comedy skills during 101 episodes. English returned to stage musicals to play roles in Simon Gallaher's production company Essgee Entertainment's trilogy of updated Gilbert and Sullivan works: Pirate King in The Pirates of Penzance (1994), Pooh-Bah in The Mikado (1995) and Dick Deadeye in H.M.S. Pinafore (1997). A performance of each production was broadcast on Australian TV, then released on VHS video and later on DVD.

In 1995, Jon English, a portrait by artist Danelle Bergstrom, won the 'Packing Room Prize' in the Archibald Prize.

From 1997 to June 1998, English toured his own musical show, Turn the Page. Later in 1998, English toured the Michael Frayn show Noises Off. In 1999, English toured Australia and New Zealand performing in A Funny Thing Happened on the Way to the Forum.

2000s

In 2000, English finished another musical project called Buskers and Angels, which toured September and October 2000 to warm reviews, and subsequently releasing a CD of the same name. At the Gimme Ted benefit concert on 10 March 2001, English was backed by his former band, Sebastian Hardie, for two of his songs. He released the amateur rights to his rock opera Paris and it was first performed in 2003 in Sydney and Gosford, New South Wales, with English assisting in the direction of the production and appearing as the Fisherman in one performance at Gosford. The piece was revived in Melbourne in 2004 and in Adelaide in 2008. Also in 2008, a re-worked version was performed in Sydney, with English as Menelaus. This revised production was met with generally positive reviews, but a few months later, English and Mackay completely updated the show.

In 2004, English appeared as Sergeant Wilson in stage productions of Dad's Army touring through Australia and New Zealand.
 
In 2006, English toured the country again as part of the Countdown Spectacular. Also in 2007, English and Peter Cupples toured their collaborative show Uncorked. Later in 2007, English filmed a children's mini-series titled Time Trackers in New Zealand, playing the role of a lovable but havoc raising hologram from the future.

In 2008, English was awarded a Life Membership to the Parramatta Eels Rugby Leagues Club. English was hired as a motivational coach for the 2009 season, when Parramatta lost the NRL Grand Final, having beaten 14 other teams in home and away games to get to the Premiership decider.

In 2009, he toured in a new production titled The Rock Show, a revue featuring classic rock music of the '60s and '70s, including songs by the Rolling Stones, Led Zeppelin, Bob Dylan, Deep Purple, Elton John and other high-profile musicians of those decades. It was conceived by "Paris" collaborator and director Stuart Smith with musical director Isaac Hayward. In 2010 "The Rock Show" made two appearances in Tasmania in support of the "Save the Tasmanian Devil" breeding programme. English was an ambassador for the programme. 
The Rock Show toured until 2013, with a CD/DVD released in 2012. In 2010, English played the title role in The Removalists by David Williamson at the Perth Theatre Company.

In 2012, English returned to Tasmania, working with Encore Theatre, for a revival of Jesus Christ Superstar, with English in the role of Pilate. Funds raised at each performance and at the Launceston preview were donated to the programme. In 2013 Jon English played at the Sweden Rock Festival, backed up by Swedish hard rock band Spearfish.

In 2015, English returned once again to play the Sweden Rock Festival and during his stay in Sweden he decided to record a new solo album together with his friends in the band Spearfish. Many new songs were written and recordings were set to start March 14, 2016.

Death
In late February 2016, English was hospitalised due to "unexpected health problems" and was forced to cancel several scheduled performances due to planned surgery for an aortic aneurysm. He died following post-operative complications late in the evening of 9 March 2016, 17 days short of his 67th birthday. A public memorial service commemorating his life was held at the Capitol Theatre, Sydney on the evening of 4 April 2016. The memorial took the form of a tribute concert and included performances by the Foster Brothers, John Paul Young, Simon Gallaher and John Waters among others.

Interests outside the arts
English described himself as a "passionate" supporter of the Australian rugby league team Parramatta Eels. He also supported the Fitzroy Football Club and launched his Some People album at Dallas Brooks Hall in Melbourne in May 1983 as a benefit for the club.
He also conducted music software courses at Sydney's Apple headquarters during the '90s.

Discography

Solo albums

 Wine Dark Sea (1973)
 It's All a Game (1974)
 Hollywood Seven (1976) 
 Minutes to Midnight (1977)
 Words Are Not Enough (1978)
 Calm Before the Storm (1980)
 In Roads (1981) 
 Jokers and Queens (with Marcia Hines)  (1982)
 Some People... (1983)
 Dark Horses (1987) 
 The Busker (1988)

Soundtrack albums
 Against the Wind aka Mot alla vindar (with Mario Millo) (1978)

Filmography
 1972 Jesus Christ Superstar TV broadcast, as self / Judas Iscariot, first TV appearance
 1975 "Homicide" special 2 hour telemovie episode called 'Stopover', ep. No. 504, as musician Gordon Haynes, first TV acting role. Not screened until 1976.
 1975 Matlock Police one episode called "The Grass is Greener" of the TV police drama, as Quinlan
 1978 Against the Wind 13 episode TV mini-series, as main character Jonathan Garrett
 1988 Rafferty Rules Season Two, Episode 2 as character David Anson
 1980 Touch and Go film, as Frank Butterfield, first film as leading male character
 1991–1993 All Together Now 101 episode TV series, as main character Bobby Rivers
 1994 The Pirates of Penzance TV broadcast of theatre performance, first of Gilbert and Sullivan trilogy from Essgee Entertainment
 1995 Frontline Himself, one episode, Let the Children Play 2000 Pizza one episode of TV comedy series
 2000 Walk the Talk film, as Phil Wehner, last known film acting role
 2006 Countdown Spectacular as self/performer
 2008 Time Trackers children's television series, as Old Troy, last known TV acting role
 2011 RocKwiz Christmas Special as self/performer, last known TV appearance

Stage and theatre works
 1972–75, 1979 – Jesus Christ Superstar 700+ performances as Judas Iscariot
 1974 The Bacchoi, Nimrod Theatre Company
 1984–86 The Pirates of Penzance as Pirate King, Victoria State Opera
 1987 Rasputin as Rasputin
 1988 Big River as Pap Finn
 1990 Paris (co-writer with David Mackay)
 1994 The Pirates of Penzance as Pirate King, Essgee Entertainment production
 1995–96 The Mikado as Pooh-Bah, Essgee Entertainment production
 1997 H.M.S. Pinafore as Dick Deadeye, Essgee Entertainment production
 1998 Noises Off 1998–99 A Funny Thing Happened on the Way to the Forum as Pseudolus, Essgee Entertainment production
 2001 Are you being Served? as Mr. James "Dick" Lucas
 2004 Dad's Army as Sergeant Wilson
 2012 Jesus Christ Superstar as Pontius Pilate
 2013 Hairspray as Edna Turnblad, Packemin Productions
 2014 Spamalot as King Arthur, Harvest Rain Theatre Company

Awards
ARIA Music Awards
The ARIA Music Awards is an annual awards ceremony that recognises excellence, innovation, and achievement across all genres of Australian music. They commenced in 1987.

|-
|rowspan="2" |  ARIA Music Awards of 1991
|rowspan="2" |  Paris (with David Mackay)
| ARIA Award for Best Original Soundtrack, Cast or Show Album
| 
|-
| ARIA Award for Best Adult Contemporary Album
| 
|-
| ARIA Music Awards of 2012
| The Rock Show| ARIA Award for Best Original Soundtrack, Cast or Show Album
| 

Countdown AwardsCountdown was an Australian pop music TV series on national broadcaster ABC-TV from 1974–1987, it presented music awards from 1979–1987, initially in conjunction with magazine TV Week. The TV Week / Countdown Awards were a combination of popular-voted and peer-voted awards.

|-
| rowspan="2" | 1979
| rowspan="2" | himself
| Most Outstanding Achievement
| 
|-
| Most Popular Male Performer
| 
|-
| 1980
| himself
| Most Popular Male Performer
| 
|-

Mo Awards
The Australian Entertainment Mo Awards (commonly known informally as the Mo Awards), were annual Australian entertainment industry awards. They recognise achievements in live entertainment in Australia from 1975 to 2016. English won six awards in that time.
 (wins only)
|-
| 1983
| Jon English
| Entertainer of the Year
| 
|-
| 1984
| Jon English
| Entertainer of the Year
| 
|-
|rowspan="2"|  1985
| Jon English
| Male Vocal Entertainer of the Year
| 
|-
| Jon English
| Entertainer of the Year
| 
|-
| 2011
| Jon English – The Rock Show| Best Rock Band or Performer of the Year
| 
|-
| 2012
| Jon English Band
| Best Rock Act of the Year
| 
|-

Other awards
 1979 – TV Week Logie Award 'Best New Talent in Australia' for role in Against the Wind 1984 – Green Room Award for Male Actor in a Leading Role (Music Theatre) for role as the Pirate King in The Pirates of PenzanceNotes

References
 Jon English, Australian singer-songwriter and All Together Now star, dies age 66 - ABC News (Australian Broadcasting Corporation)
 "The Dictionary of Performing Arts in Australia – Theatre. Film. Radio. Television – Volume 1" – Ann Atkinson, Linsay Knight, Margaret McPhee – Allen & Unwin Pty. Ltd., 1996
 "The Dictionary of Performing Arts in Australia – Opera. Music. Dance – Volume 2" – Ann Atkinson, Linsay Knight, Margaret McPhee – Allen & Unwin Pty. Ltd., 1996
 "The Australian Film and Television Companion" – compiled by Tony Harrison – Simon & Schuster Australia, 1994
 "The Book – Top 40 Research''" – Jim Barnes, Stephen Scanes, 2000

External links
Jon English – Official Web Site

Jon English – Central Musical Instruments
Jon English: a conversation – Australian Broadcasting Corporation
Jon English – Australian Broadcasting Corporation
Jon of all trades – "The Age" newspaper
Performance photo of Jon English as the Pirate King in "The Pirates of Penzance" 

1949 births
2016 deaths
Deaths from aortic aneurysm
20th-century guitarists
21st-century guitarists
20th-century Australian male singers
21st-century Australian male singers
ARIA Award winners
English emigrants to Australia
Australian comedy writers
Australian male comedians
Australian male film actors
Australian male stage actors
Australian male television actors
Australian male writers
Australian musical theatre composers
Australian rock guitarists
Australian rock musicians
Australian rock singers
Australian songwriters
Australian television writers
Logie Award winners
Australian male television writers
Naturalised citizens of Australia
Rhythm guitarists
People from Hampstead
Singers from Sydney
Writers from Sydney
Australian male guitarists